The 1993–94 Edmonton Oilers season was the Oilers' 15th season in the NHL, and they were coming off their worst season in team history in 1992–93, finishing with only 60 points and failing to qualify for the playoffs for the first time.

During the off-season, the NHL announced it renamed the divisions and conferences, and the Oilers were placed in the newly created Pacific Division in the Western Conference, along with their Battle of Alberta rivals, the Calgary Flames, Vancouver Canucks, Los Angeles Kings, San Jose Sharks, and the expansion Mighty Ducks of Anaheim.

Edmonton got off to a horrible start, starting the year 3–18–3, before head coach Ted Green was fired and replaced by Glen Sather for the rest of the season. The Oilers played much better under Sather but still fail to qualify for the playoffs for the 2nd straight season, finishing 18 points behind the 8th seeded San Jose Sharks. During the season, Edmonton once again traded veteran players for youngsters, as team captain Craig MacTavish was dealt to the New York Rangers for Todd Marchant, while Dave Manson was shipped to the Winnipeg Jets for Boris Mironov.

Offensively, Doug Weight led the club with 74 points, while 19-year-old rookie Jason Arnott scored a team high 33 goals, and finish just behind Weight with 68 points. Shayne Corson and Zdeno Cíger each scored over 20 goals, with 25 and 22 respectively. Igor Kravchuk led the Oilers blueline with 12 goals and 50 points, while Bob Beers put together a solid season on defense, scoring 10 goals and 37 points.  Kelly Buchberger was the team leader in penalty minutes, accumulating 199.

In goal, Bill Ranford appeared in a career high 71 games, winning 22 of them, with a 3.48 GAA and 1 shutout. Rookie Fred Brathwaite backed him up, appearing in 19 games, and winning 3 of them.

The Oilers scored the fewest shorthanded goals (2) during the regular season.

Season standings

Schedule and results

Season stats

Scoring leaders

Goaltending

Awards and records

Awards

Milestones

Transactions

Trades

Free agents

Draft picks
Edmonton's draft picks at the 1993 NHL Entry Draft, the Oilers had two picks in the first round as part of the Wayne Gretzky trade.

References

SHRP Sports
The Internet Hockey Database
National Hockey League Guide & Record Book 2007

E
Edmon
Edmonton Oilers seasons